Germany has participated in every edition of the World Athletics Championships since 1991. Prior to 1991, separate West Germany and East Germany teams competed at the global athletics competition. Germany has won the fourth highest total of gold medals at the event and has the fifth highest medal total.

Germany's delegations are typically among the largest at the competition, numbering around 60-80 athletes. The country has a strong history in the sport for both men's and women's teams, and it enters competitors in most events at each championships. It ranks second behind the United States in the World Athletics placing tables, which awards points for top eight finishes. Germany has been most successful in the men's and women's throwing events, and the field events more generally. Its relay teams are competitive and regularly make the finals.

The country's most successful athlete is men's discus throw champion Lars Riedel, who from 1991 to 2001 won five world titles and one bronze medal. Another discus thrower, Robert Harting, has three gold medals and one silver medal to his name. Several women hold a claim to be Germany's most successful female athlete: Astrid Kumbernuss and Franka Dietzsch each have won three gold medals in throwing events, sprinter Grit Breuer has the highest total at six medals, while another sprinter Katrin Krabbe has two golds and two bronze medals (all won in 1991).

As of the 2019 World Athletics Championships, no German athlete has been disqualified from the competition for doping.

Medal table 
Red border indicates tournament was held on home soil.

Medalists

References 

IAAF Statistics Book – IAAF World Championships London 2017
Germany at the 2017 World Championships in Athletics

 
Germany
World Championships in Athletics
World Championships